The lumbricals are four small skeletal muscles, accessory to the tendons of the flexor digitorum longus muscle. They are numbered from the medial side of the foot.

Structure 
The lumbricals arise from the tendons of the flexor digitorum longus muscle, as far back as their angles of division, each springing from two tendons, except the first. The first lumbrical is unipennate, while the second, third and fourth are bipennate.

The muscles end in tendons, which pass forward on the medial sides of the four lesser toes, and are inserted into the expansions of the tendons of the extensor digitorum longus muscle on the dorsal surfaces of the proximal phalanges. All four lumbricals insert into extensor hoods of the phalanges, thus creating extension at the inter-phalangeal (PIP and DIP) joints. However, as the tendons also pass inferior to the metatarsal phalangeal (MTP) joints it creates flexion at this joint.

Innervation 

The most medial lumbrical is innervated by the medial plantar nerve while the remaining three lumbricals are supplied by the lateral plantar nerve.

Variation 

Absence of one or more; doubling of the third or fourth even the fifth. Insertion partly or wholly into the first phalanges.

History 
The term "lumbrical" comes from the Latin, meaning "worm".

Additional images

References

External links 
 PTCentral

Foot muscles
Muscles of the lower limb